The Lord High Constable of England is the seventh of the Great Officers of State, ranking beneath the Lord Great Chamberlain and above the Earl Marshal. This office is now called out of abeyance only for coronations. The Lord High Constable was originally the commander of the royal armies and the Master of the Horse. He was also, in conjunction with the Earl Marshal, president of the court of chivalry or court of honour. In feudal times, martial law was administered in the court of the Lord High Constable.

The constableship was granted as a grand serjeanty with the Earldom of Hereford by the Empress Matilda to Miles of Gloucester, and was carried by his heiress to the Bohuns, earls of Hereford and Essex. They had a surviving male heir, and still have heirs male, but due to the power of the monarchy the constableship was irregularly given to the Staffords, Dukes of Buckingham; and on the attainder of Edward Stafford, the third Duke, in the reign of King Henry VIII, it became merged into the Crown. Since that point it has not existed as a separate office, except as a temporary appointment for the coronation of a monarch; in other circumstances the Earl Marshal exercises the traditional duties of the office.

The Lacys and Verduns were hereditary constables of Ireland from the 12th to the 14th century; and the Hays, earls of Erroll, have been hereditary Lord High Constables of Scotland from early in the 14th century.

Lord High Constables of England, 1139–1521
 1139–1143: Miles of Gloucester, 1st Earl of Hereford
 1143–1155: Roger Fitzmiles, 2nd Earl of Hereford
 1155–1159: Walter of Hereford
 1159–1164: Henry Fitzmiles
 1164–1176: Humphrey III de Bohun
 1176–1220: Henry de Bohun, 1st Earl of Hereford
 1220–1275: Humphrey de Bohun, 2nd Earl of Hereford and 1st Earl of Essex
 1275–1298: Humphrey de Bohun, 3rd Earl of Hereford and 2nd Earl of Essex
 1298–1322: Humphrey de Bohun, 4th Earl of Hereford and 3rd Earl of Essex
 1322–1336: John de Bohun, 5th Earl of Hereford and 4th Earl of Essex
 1336–1361: Humphrey de Bohun, 6th Earl of Hereford and 5th Earl of Essex
 1361–1373: Humphrey de Bohun, 7th Earl of Hereford, 6th Earl of Essex and 2nd Earl of Northampton
A cousin was alive who was not granted the titles due to him and his heirs: Gilbert de Bohun, died 1381
 1373–1397: Thomas of Woodstock, 1st Duke of Gloucester (5th surviving son of King Edward III and husband of Eleanor de Bohun, elder daughter and co-heiress of Humphrey de Bohun, 7th Earl of Hereford)
 1397–1399: Humphrey, 2nd Earl of Buckingham
 1399–1403: Henry Percy, 1st Earl of Northumberland
 1403–?: John of Lancaster, 1st Duke of Bedford (died 1435)
 1445–1450: John Beaumont, 1st Viscount Beaumont (died 1460)
 ?–1455: Edmund Beaufort, 2nd Duke of Somerset
 1455: Humphrey Stafford, 1st Duke of Buckingham
 1455–1456: Richard, Duke of York
 1456–1460: Humphrey Stafford, 1st Duke of Buckingham
 1461–1467: John Tiptoft, 1st Earl of Worcester
 1467–1469: Richard Woodville, 1st Earl Rivers
 1469–1470: Richard, Duke of Gloucester
 1470–1471: John de Vere, 13th Earl of Oxford
 1471–1483: Richard, Duke of Gloucester
 1483: Henry Stafford, 2nd Duke of Buckingham
 1483–1504: Thomas Stanley, 2nd Baron Stanley
 1504–1521: Edward Stafford, 3rd Duke of Buckingham

Lord High Constables of England, 1522–present
At this point, the office merged with the Crown and was revived only for coronations. It was held at coronations by the following individuals:

See also 
 Constable of France, a similar office in France

References

 

Constitution of the United Kingdom
 Lord High Constable
 
Constables